Luk chup, also spelled look choop, is a type of Thai dessert derived from marzipan, a recipe from Portugal, called . The Portuguese used almonds as the main ingredient but, given the absence of almonds in Thailand, they were replaced by mung beans.

In the past it was made only for the king, royal families and people in the palace. Nowadays, luk chup can be purchased in general dessert shops in Thailand. The shape of luk chup is molded into fruit or vegetable shapes such as a mango, a chili and orange, etc. with colors that match the color of the foods they represent.

Typical ingredients in luk chup include mung beans, coconut milk, sugar, jelly powder, water and food coloring. The beans, coconut milk and sugar are mixed into a paste, from which the luk chup is then formed. The food coloring can be painted onto the dessert, and it is sometimes dipped in agar to provide a shiny appearance.

See also

 List of Thai desserts

References

External links
 Thai Desserts Look Choop. thaifood.food-recipe-cooking.com.

Thai desserts and snacks